Harrigan is a surname. Notable people with the surname include:

Bill Harrigan, Australian rugby league football referee
David Xavier Harrigan (1948–2000), singer, actor, and painter known as Tomata du Plenty  
Duncan Harrigan (born 1921), Scottish footballer
Edward Harrigan (1845–1911), American playwright, lyricist, actor and theater owner
John Harrigan (fl. 1990s), actor, writer and filmmaker
Matt Harrigan, American actor, producer, and writer
Nedda Harrigan (ca. 1900-1989), American actress, daughter of Edward ("Ned") Harrigan
Tahesia Harrigan (born 1982), British Virgin Islands sprinter
William Harrigan (1893–1966), American actor, son of Edward ("Ned") Harrigan
Michael Harrigan, police detective from Predator 2; he is played by Danny Glover